This timeline lists all sovereign states and dependencies in Oceania, both current and defunct, from the year 1750 onwards.

Timeline

Notes

See also
List of sovereign states and dependent territories in Oceania
List of sovereign states by date of formation
List of predecessors of sovereign states in Oceania
Timeline of sovereign states in Europe
Timeline of sovereign states in North America
Timeline of sovereign states in South America

References

Sovereign States
Oceania Sovereign States
Lists of former countries
Former countries in Oceania
History of Oceania